The nukupuu (genus Hemignathus) is a group of critically endangered species of Hawaiian honeycreeper in the family Fringillidae. There are no recent confirmed records for any of the species and they may be extinct or functionally extinct.

Description
 
Males have yellow underparts and head. The upperparts are duller, darker and greenish. Females are overall duller, with most of the underparts whitish. The lores, eye-ring and long decurved bill are blackish.

The last sightings - both on Kauai and Maui - were in 1998, though it is possible some of the sighting in the 1990s actually involve the Kauai amakihi. Later sightings remain unconfirmed. Recent surveys have failed to locate any of the species and the United States Fish and Wildlife Service concluded that it in all probability are extinct or functionally extinct. As several other Hawaiian honeycreeper, the decline of the nukupuu group is connected to habitat loss (both due to man and hurricanes), introduced predators and disease-carrying mosquitoes.

The Maui nukupuu is one of the species a project of the East Maui Watershed has been aimed at. Other birds from this area included the ōū and the poouli. The project involved fencing in the area and eradicating introduced predators. The entire project took out 22 feral cats, 209 pigs, 1,596 Polynesian rats, 1,205 black rats, and 1,948 common mice. On Kauai, comparable projects exists around the Koaie Stream.

Species 
 Giant nukupu‘u, Hemignathus vorpalis - prehistoric
 Maui nukupuu (Hemignathus affinis) Critically endangered or extinct - 1995-1998
 Kauai nukupuu (Hemignathus hanapepe) extinct - 1998
 Oahu nukupuu (Hemignathus lucidus) extinct - 1837

References

 James, Helen F., & Olson, Storrs L. (2003). A giant new species of nukupuu (Fringillidae: Drepanidini: Hemignathus) from the island of Hawaii. The Auk. 120(4): 970–981.

External links
Species factsheet - BirdLife International
3D view of specimen RMNH 110.002 at Naturalis, Leiden (requires QuickTime browser plugin)

Hemignathus
Hawaiian honeycreepers
Endemic fauna of Hawaii
Critically endangered fauna of Hawaii
Extinct birds of Hawaii
Taxonomy articles created by Polbot
Bird common names